Tobias Busch (born 13 May 1988, Stralsund, Germany) is a former speedway rider from Germany.

Career
He started his British speedway career with the Edinburgh Monarchs. He joined the Redcar Bears in 2016. In 2017, he made his debut in the Astana Expo FIM Ice Speedway Gladiators World Championship Qualification round for the individual series which took place on 7 January in Ylitornio, Finland representing Germany scoring 4 points.

He announced his retirement at the end of the 2022 season.

References 

1988 births
Living people
German speedway riders
People from Stralsund
Sportspeople from Mecklenburg-Western Pomerania
Edinburgh Monarchs riders
Redcar Bears riders